Timothy Leonard may refer to:

 Timothy D. Leonard (born 1940), U.S. District Judge
 Timothy Leonard (priest) (1893–1931), Irish priest
 Timothy Leonard (Colorado politician), Colorado state representative